Tu Shao-chieh (born 2 January 1999) is a Taiwanese professional soccer player who plays as a defender for Ming Chuan University and the Chinese Taipei national team.

International goals

References

External links

Living people
1999 births
Taiwanese footballers
Chinese Taipei international footballers
Association football defenders
Footballers from Taipei